Craig Scott Hawtin (born 29 March 1970) is an English former professional footballer who played as a full-back in the Football League for Chester City.

Career statistics
Source:

References

1970 births
Living people
People from Buxton
Footballers from Derbyshire
English footballers
Association football fullbacks
Port Vale F.C. players
Chester City F.C. players
Burnley F.C. players
Runcorn F.C. Halton players
English Football League players
National League (English football) players